Nikolaos K. Martis (1 January 1915 – 12 November 2013) was a Greek author and politician.

Military career
He was serving in the Hellenic Army as an artillery officer and when the Germans occupied northern Greece, he vanished to Mount Athos and from there to Egypt where he fought on the Allied side. His very first mission of his military career began in June 1941 when the Greek Army landed in the Middle East. From there, he participated in various battles such as the First and Second Battles of El Alamein in 1942 and later the Battle of Rimini and Dekemvriana in 1944.

Office career
From 1955 to 1956, he held office as secretary general in the Ministry for Northern Greece and was elected seven times as a member of Parliament throughout his political career. From 1956 to 1958, he was undersecretary to the Ministry of Commerce (1956–1958) and from that year till 1961 served as the Minister of Industry. From 1974 to 1981, he was the Minister for Northern Greece.

Death
Martis died in Moustheni, Kavala Prefecture, Greece at the age of 98 and was buried at the First Cemetery of Athens.

References

Further reading
The Falsification of Macedonian History (book review)
Nikolaos Martis

1915 births
2013 deaths
Greek Macedonians
Greek Rally politicians
National Radical Union politicians
New Democracy (Greece) politicians
Ministers for Northern Greece
Greek MPs 1951–1952
Greek MPs 1956–1958
20th-century Greek lawyers
20th-century Greek historians
Greek military personnel of World War II
Grand Crosses with Star and Sash of the Order of Merit of the Federal Republic of Germany

People from Kavala (regional unit)